Reinsvoll is a village in Vestre Toten Municipality in Innlandet county, Norway. The village is located along the Norwegian National Road 4 between the villages of Eina and Raufoss. Reinsvoll has a train station that is located along the Gjøvik Line. The village has a football stadium, a pub, a barber, a lower secondary school, a primary school, a kindergarten, a grocery store, a fuel station, a psychiatric hospital, and run-down mill.

History
Reinsvoll is first mentioned in existing historical records in 1616. By the early 17th century, there were farmers and laborers working in the village area. The original reason for the dense settlement at Reinsvoll was the Hunnselva river which could be exploited for the mill that was built along the river around the year 1800. The opening of the Gjøvikbanen and Skreiabanen railway lines in 1902 brought major changes. The workers who came to build the train line settled in Reinsvoll or stayed in one of the hotels that were there.

References

Vestre Toten
Villages in Innlandet